Kunburudhoo as a place name may refer to:
 Kunburudhoo (Alif Dhaal Atoll) (Republic of Maldives)
 Kunburudhoo (Haa Dhaalu Atoll) (Republic of Maldives)